Kepler-31 is a star in the northern constellation of Cygnus, the swan, that is orbited by a planet found to be unequivocally within the star's habitable zone. It is located at the celestial coordinates: Right Ascension , Declination . With an apparent visual magnitude of 14.0, this star is too faint to be seen with the naked eye.

Planetary system
The three gas giant planets orbiting Kepler-31 were discovered in early 2011, albeit with large false alarm probability, and were confirmed in 2012. The planets form a resonant chain, with orbital periods ratio 1:2:4, although 20% probability exists that these period ratios may be coincidental.

References

Cygnus (constellation)
G-type main-sequence stars
935
Planetary transit variables
Planetary systems with three confirmed planets